Vilula, also known as Vihula, is an unincorporated community in Perry County, Alabama, United States.

History
A post office operated under the name Vilula from 1886 to 1894. One structure in Vilula, The Birds' Nest, was documented in the Historic American Buildings Survey.

Gallery

References

Unincorporated communities in Perry County, Alabama
Unincorporated communities in Alabama